The Tokyo City Cup Stakes is an American Thoroughbred horse race run annually at the beginning of April at Santa Anita Park in Arcadia, California. A Grade III event raced on dirt at a distance of  miles (12 furlongs), it is open to horses aged four and older.

Run as the San Bernardino Handicap prior to 2005, the race's name honors the partnership between Santa Anita Park and Ohi Racecourse in Tokyo, Japan.

The race was open to three-year-olds only in 1957 and for three-year-olds and up from 1958 through 1967. Raced on dirt at  miles from 1957 through 1966  and on turf at  miles from 1967 through 1972 and 1974 through 1978 at which point it switched back to dirt.

Since inception it has been contested at various distances and run on both dirt and turf:
  miles : 1957–1966  on dirt
  miles : 1967–1972, 1974–1978 on turf
  miles : 1979–2007 on dirt
  miles : 2008 on dirt

The Tokyo City Cup Stakes was run in two divisions in 1971 and again in 1974.

Records
Speed  record: 
 2:28.79 - Big John B (2016) (at current distance of  miles on dirt)

Most wins:
 3 - Del Mar Dennis (1994, 1995, 1996)

Most wins by a jockey:
 7 - Laffit Pincay, Jr. (1967, 1968, 1971, 1974, 1979, 1985, 1989)

Most wins by a trainer:
 12 - Charles Whittingham (1960, 1969, 1971, 1973, 1975, 1981, 1983, 1985, 1987, 1989, 1990, 1991)

Most wins by an owner:
 4 - Trudy McCaffery & John Toffan (1994, 1995, 1996, 2002)

Winners

Other North American Marathon races
On dirt: 
 Brooklyn Handicap
 Fort Harrod Stakes
 Gallant Man Handicap
 Valedictory Stakes

On turf:
 Canadian International Stakes
 Carleton F. Burke Handicap
 San Juan Capistrano Invitational Handicap

References
 Tokyo City Cup website
 The 2008 Tokyo City Cup at the NTRA

Graded stakes races in the United States
Horse races in California
Flat horse races for four-year-olds
Recurring sporting events established in 1957
Santa Anita Park
1957 establishments in California